The voiceless bilabially post-trilled dental stop is a very rare consonantal sound reported to occur in a few spoken languages: the Oro Win and Wariʼ languages in South America and Sangtam in Northeast India.

Features
Features of the voiceless bilabially post-trilled dental stop:

 It has two places of articulation:
 The stop is dental, which means it is articulated with either the tip or the blade of the tongue at the upper teeth, termed respectively apical and laminal.
 The trill is bilabial, which means it is articulated with both lips.

Occurrence

References

External links
 

Pulmonic consonants
Voiceless oral consonants
Central consonants
Trill consonants